Eventide is a five-track extended play by Australian singer-songwriter, Monique Brumby. It was released in August 1998 by Sony Music Australia. A music video for its lead track, "Wrecking Ball", was released to promote the EP.

In Hobart newspaper, The Examiner, on 13 October 1998, former local resident Brumby described the EP to the reporter, "There's a lot more space in the music on Eventide. The songs have got more of an edge and there's also some experimentation with electronica. We thought we'd release the five tracks as a bit of a taste test." She explained that it would provide a "bridge" between her debut album, Thylacine (1997), and her next one.

Track listing

 "Wrecking Ball" (Monique Brumby) – 3:56
 "Way It Goes" (Brumby, Maryanne T Window) – 5:01
 "A Better Way" (Brumby, John Shanks) – 3:57
 "Progress" (Brumby) – 3:43
 "Gold Dust" (Brumby, Carl Manuell, Ross Farrell) – 5:14

Credits

Adapted from EP liner.
 Monique Brumby – acoustic guitar, lead vocals
 Peter Luscombe – lead guitar
 Memory Man – djembe, lead guitar
 Carl Manuell – drums
 Helen Mountford – cello
 Michael Sheridan – keyboards
 Phil Wales – lead guitar
 Maryanne Window – guitars (bass, acoustic)

References

Monique Brumby albums
1998 EPs